Susan Conant is an American mystery writer best known for her Dog Lover's Mysteries series, featuring magazine writer Holly Winter.  Conant graduated from Radcliffe College with a degree in social relations, and a doctorate from Harvard University in human development.  She is active in Alaskan Malamute Rescue and is a three-time recipient of the Dog Writers Association of America's Maxwell Award for Fiction Writing. She is also the author of the Cat Lover's Mysteries series and co-author with daughter Jessica Conant-Park of the Gourmet Girl Mysteries series.

Publications

Dog Lover's Mysteries
 A New Leash on Death (1990) 
 Dead and Doggone (1990) 
 A Bite of Death (1991) 
 Paws Before Dying (1991) 
 Gone to the Dogs (1992) 
 Bloodlines (1992) 
 Ruffly Speaking (1994) 
 Black Ribbon (1995) 
 Stud Rites (1996) 
 Animal Appetite (1997) 
 The Barker Street Regulars (1998) 
 Evil Breeding (1999) 
 Creature Discomforts (2001)  (paperback)
 The Wicked Flea (2002)  (paperback)
 The Dogfather (2003)  (paperback)
 Bride and Groom (2004)  (paperback)
 Gaits of Heaven (2006)  (hardcover)
 All Shots (2007)  (hardcover)
 Brute Strength (2011)  (hardcover)
 Sire and Damn (2015)  (paperback)

Cat Lover's Mysteries
 Scratch the Surface (2005) about sleuth Felicity; cats Edith & Brigitte

Gourmet Girl Mysteries
Co-written with daughter Jessica Conant-Park.
 Steamed
 Simmer Down
 Turn Up the Heat

References

20th-century American novelists
21st-century American novelists
American crime fiction writers
American women novelists
Radcliffe College alumni
Year of birth missing (living people)
Living people
20th-century American women writers
21st-century American women writers
Women crime fiction writers